'Nonpareil' is a class of old apple cultivars . It is a type of russet apple.
-

From England
Braddick's Nonpareil
Early Nonpareil
Lodgemore Nonpareil
Martin Nonpareil
Morris's Nonpareil Russet
Nonpareil(syn. Old Nonpareil)
Petworth Nonpareil
Pitmaston Nonpareil
Scarlet Nonpareil
Swenny Nonparael
From Ireland
Ross Nonpareil
From America
Fleet's Nonpareil
Foote's Nonpareil
Ohio Nonpareil
Origin unknown
French Nonpareil
White Nonpareil

See also
 Brogdale

References

External links

Apple cultivars